Cadherin-23 is a protein that in humans is encoded by the CDH23 gene.

Function 

This gene is a member of the cadherin superfamily, genes encoding calcium dependent cell-cell adhesion glycoproteins. The protein encoded by this gene is a large, single-pass transmembrane protein composed of an extracellular domain containing 27 repeats that show significant homology to the cadherin ectodomain. Expressed in the neurosensory epithelium, the protein is thought to be involved in stereocilia organization and hair bundle formation. Specifically, it is thought to interact with protocadherin 15 to form tip-link filaments.

Clinical significance 

The gene is located in a region containing the human deafness loci DFNB12 and USH1D. Usher syndrome 1D and nonsyndromic autosomal recessive deafness DFNB12 are caused by allelic mutations of this novel cadherin-like gene. The gene is associated with kidney function decline.

Interactions 

CDH23 has been shown to interact with USH1C.

References

Further reading

External links